Chet Koneczny (born May 9, 1984) is a professional lacrosse player for the Halifax Thunderbirds in the National Lacrosse League.

College and club career
Koneczny attended York University, where he earned a bachelor's degree in kinesiology.  He was recruited to play quarterback for the college football team.  He was a decorated player in the Ontario Lacrosse Association, where he played in both the junior and senior divisions.  He earned "Most Improved Player" award in 2001, helping the Scarborough Saints (Jr. B) to a bronze medal in the national championships.  He was a member of the Barrie Tornado (Jr. B) National Champion team in 2003.  He received "Unsung Hero" award for Orangeville Northmen (Jr. A) in 2005.  He played for Barrie Lakeshores (Sr. A) in 2006–07.  He was selected "Best Two-Way" player for Owen Sound (Sr. B), helping that team win back-to-back National Championships in 2008–09.  He was a standout Defenseman/Transition player for Kitchener Kodiaks (Sr. A) in 2009.

Professional career
Koneczny was a third round draft pick of the Toronto Rock in the 2004 NLL Entry Draft.  Spent time on the Rock's practice squad in 2005 and 2006.  Attended training camp with Toronto in 2009.  Signed by the Orlando Titans as an unrestricted free agent prior to the start of 2010 training camp.  Selected by the Washington Stealth in the first round (10th overall) of the Orlando Titans Dispersal Draft. On August 13, 2012, Koneczny signed as an unrestricted free agent to a one-year agreement with the Colorado Mammoth of the NLL.

International career
Because of his Czech ancestors, Koneczny was able to play for Czech Republic in field lacrosse on 2010 World Lacrosse Championship, as well as in box lacrosse on 2011 FIL World Indoor Lacrosse Championship. On both tournaments, he showed himself as a very useful player, mainly because of his experience from the National Lacrosse League. He once again represented the Czech Republic at the 2019 World Indoor Lacrosse Championship, recording five points in eight total games.

Statistics

NLL

Statistics are as of December 18, 2018.

References

External links
Chet Koneczny at NLL.com
Chet Koneczny at Philadelphia Wings website
https://web.archive.org/web/20110716133522/http://www.stealthlax.com/team/roster/chet-koneczny
https://www.youtube.com/watch?v=a8YCLuH0Otk

1984 births
Living people
Canadian lacrosse players
Halifax Thunderbirds players
National Lacrosse League players
Orlando Titans players
People from Truro, Nova Scotia
Sportspeople from Nova Scotia
Washington Stealth players